Curt Pardridge (born March 12, 1964) is a former American football wide receiver. He played for the Seattle Seahawks in 1987.

References

External links

1964 births
Living people
People from DeKalb, Illinois
Players of American football from Illinois
American football wide receivers
Northern Illinois Huskies football players
Seattle Seahawks players